Spitalfields City Farm is a city farm in the London Borough of Tower Hamlets, a short distance from Brick Lane.

The farm was opened in 1978 on a  wasteland site that was a former railway goods depot. Initially an allotment site, it expanded to house animals, and became a charity in 1980.

Since 2008 the farm has held an annual "Oxford vs Cambridge Goat Race", coinciding with and parodying The Boat Race on the River Thames.

References

External links
 

Parks and open spaces in the London Borough of Tower Hamlets
Charities based in London
City farms in London
Spitalfields